Desley Carleton Scott (born 27 June 1943 in Toowoomba) is an Australian retired Labor Party politician who was the member for Woodridge in the Parliament of Queensland from 2001 to 2015.

Scott was elected to parliament at the 2001 state election, after working as an electoral officer for 16 years. She holds a dental nurse certificate.

Due to the tiny size of the ALP caucus since the party's defeat at the 2012 election, she was a member of the shadow cabinet but did not become a minister as she retired at the 2015 election.

At the 2012 election, Scott retained her seat with a significant margin for a Labor MP of 5.8%, after a 19.57% swing against her party. According to Independent MP Alex Douglas, "She was completely focussed on the needs of Woodridge residents, which in turn earned her the respect of her constituents.", which led to her being one of only seven Queensland ALP MPs being elected at the 2012 election.

Opposition Period 2012-2015
Under Queensland ALP Leader Annastacia Palaszczuk, Scott was given the Shadow Portfolios of Disabilities, Communities, Child Safety, Mental Health, Women and Multicultural Affairs. She was also the Deputy Opposition Whip.

References

External links
 by Faith Williams. Signs of the Times (Australian version) 120:8 (August 2005), p 7–9

1943 births
Living people
Members of the Queensland Legislative Assembly
Australian Seventh-day Adventists
Australian Labor Party members of the Parliament of Queensland
21st-century Australian politicians
21st-century Australian women politicians
Women members of the Queensland Legislative Assembly